Bulgaria was represented by 72 athletes at the 2008 Summer Olympics, held in Beijing, People's Republic of China.

Medalists

Archery

The country has allocated one spot in the men's individual event. Daniel Pavlov qualified at the 2007 World Championships.

Athletics

Men
Track & road events

Field events

Women
Track & road events

* On 13 June 2008, Daniela Yordanova was tested positive for testosterone in an out-of-competition doping test in Sofia.

Field events

Badminton

Boxing

Bulgaria had qualified two boxers for the Olympics: Boris Georgiev, light welterweight, European gold medalist in 2006 and Olympic bronze medalist from Athens 2004 and Kubrat Pulev, super heavyweight, bronze world medalist in 2005 and bronze European medalist in 2006

Canoeing

Sprint

Qualification Legend: QS = Qualify to semi-final; QF = Qualify directly to final

Cycling

Road

Gymnastics

Artistic
Men

Women

Rhythmic

Rowing 

Men

Women

Qualification Legend: FA=Final A (medal); FB=Final B (non-medal); FC=Final C (non-medal); FD=Final D (non-medal); FE=Final E (non-medal); FF=Final F (non-medal); SA/B=Semifinals A/B; SC/D=Semifinals C/D; SE/F=Semifinals E/F; QF=Quarterfinals; R=Repechage

Sailing

Women

M = Medal race; EL = Eliminated – did not advance into the medal race; CAN = Race cancelled

Shooting

Men

Women

Swimming

Men

Women

Tennis

Volleyball

Men's indoor tournament

Bulgaria's men's team qualified as bronze medalists from the 2007 FIVB Men's World Cup. The team won three of its group play matches, and advanced to the quarterfinals, where they lost to Russia. The team's final ranking in the tournament was tied for 5th place.

Roster

Group play

All times are China Standard Time (UTC+8).

Quarterfinal

Wrestling

On 9 August 2008, Anatolie Guidea ruptured his Achilles' tendon and could not compete in the event. The Bulgarian Wrestling Federation has asked another Bulgarian wrestler, Ismail Redzhep, to replace Guidia, but he was involved in a car accident, prompting him not to compete. Eventually, the freed spot was taken by Mike Zadick from the United States.

Men's freestyle

Men's Greco-Roman

Women's freestyle

Weightlifting controversy
The Bulgarian Olympic Committee initially selected a team of 8 athletes, 6 men and 2 women, for weightlifting, but decided to withdraw its entire weightlifting delegation to the games, after its athletes had been tested positive for a banned anabolic steroid substance.

References

Nations at the 2008 Summer Olympics
2008
Summer Olympics